Almost Famous is a soundtrack album to the film of the same name, released in 2000. It was awarded the 2001 Grammy Award for Best Compilation Soundtrack Album for a Motion Picture, Television or Other Visual Media.

In May 2021, UMe announced the reissue of the soundtrack as an expanded five CD/seven LP boxed set. It will be the first time  all of the music featured in the film will be released in one set.

Track listing

Personnel ("Stillwater") 
 Billy Crudup ("Russell Hammond") - lead guitar
 Jason Lee ("Jeff Bebe") - lead singer
 John Fedevich ("Ed Vallencourt") - drums
 Mark Kozelek ("Larry Fellows") - bass guitar

Personnel 
 Peter Frampton
 Mike McCready
 Jon Bayless
 Ben Smith
 Gordon Kennedy
 Marti Frederiksen – vocals

Additional music 
Other music used in the film did not appear on the soundtrack album. As with the songs in the released soundtrack, they are usually snippets of a minute or less.
 Alvin and the Chipmunks: "The Chipmunk Song (Christmas Don't Be Late)"
 Brenton Wood: "The Oogum Boogum Song"
 The Stooges: "Search and Destroy"
 Black Sabbath: "Paranoid"
 Jethro Tull "Teacher"
 Yes: "Roundabout"
 Joni Mitchell: "River"
 Black Sabbath: "Sweet Leaf"
 Nancy Wilson: "Cabin in the Air"
 Little Feat: "Easy to Slip"
 Raspberries: "Go All the Way"
 Stillwater: "Hour of Need"
 The Guess Who: "Albert Flasher"
 Stillwater: "Love Thing"
 Neil Young and Crazy Horse: "Everybody Knows This Is Nowhere"
 Fleetwood Mac: "Future Games"
 Deep Purple: "Burn"
 Stillwater: "You Had to Be There"
 Blodwyn Pig: "Dear Jill"
 Steely Dan: "Reelin' in the Years"
 MC5: "Looking at You"
 Stillwater: "Love Comes and Goes"
 The Jimi Hendrix Experience: "Voodoo Child (Slight Return)"
 Free: "Wishing Well"
 Buddy Holly and The Crickets: "Peggy Sue" #
 Dr. Hook & The Medicine Show: "The Cover of "Rolling Stone"" #
 Elton John: "Mona Lisas and Mad Hatters"
 Stevie Wonder: "My Cherie Amour"
 Chicago: "Colour My World" #
 Neil Young: "Cortez the Killer" (live recording from the Paramount Theater in Oakland, California on 20 March 1999)
 Led Zeppelin: "The Rain Song"
 Led Zeppelin: "Bron-Yr-Aur"
 Led Zeppelin: "Tangerine"
 Led Zeppelin: "Misty Mountain Hop"
 Stillwater: "Chance Upon You" @
 Pete Droge and Elaine Summers: "Small Time Blues" # Portraying  Gram Parsons and Emmylou Harris at the Riot House Hotel

 # Sung or performed by a character in the film
 @ Only featured in the director's cut, Untitled

Chart performance 
Album

Year-end charts

Certifications

References 

2000s film soundtrack albums
DreamWorks Records soundtracks
Albums produced by Cameron Crowe
Grammy Award for Best Compilation Soundtrack for Visual Media